Events from the year 1764 in Sweden

Incumbents
 Monarch – Adolf Frederick

Events

 - The finances of the state forces the government of the Hats (party) to assemble the Riksdag of the Estates.
 – Louis Frossard and Marie-Renée Frossard are engaged at the French Theatre in Stockholm.
 - St Lucia day celebration the tradition of Lucia wearing white was started at a Manor in the Västergötland province

Births

 8 February - Rudolf Cederström, naval commander  (died 1833)
 25 February - Carl Gustaf von Brinkman, poet and diplomat (died 1847) 
 3 September - Karl Adolf Boheman, mystic and freemason  (died 1831) 
 24 November – Ulrika Carolina Widström, poet  (died 1840) 
 - Samuel Ahlgren, actor  (died 1816)

Deaths

 January 18 - Samuel Troilius, arch bishop  (born 1706)

References

 
Years of the 18th century in Sweden
Sweden